Rita Taimalietane Fatialofa-Patolo  (née Fatialofa, born 1963) is a Samoan sportsperson who played netball and softball for New Zealand.

Biography

Fatialofa-Patolo attended Lynfield College in Auckland.

She played for the New Zealand national netball team, the Silver Ferns, from 1982 to 1989. While able to play the shooting circle, her specialised position was wing-attack. She retired after the 1989 World Games where New Zealand defeated Australia in the final. Fatialofa-Patolo later coached the Samoan national netball team at the 1991 and 1995 Netball World Championships. In 1999, she was inducted into the New Zealand Sports Hall of Fame, and was also included in Netball New Zealand's all-time Dream Team. In softball, she was a member of the team that won the 1982 ISF World Championship in Taipei, defeating the host nation in the final.

In the 2014 New Year Honours, Fatialofa-Patolo was appointed a Member of the New Zealand Order of Merit for services to sport.

References

1963 births
Living people
Samoan netball players
New Zealand international netball players
New Zealand softball players
World Games gold medalists
Netball players at the 1989 World Games
Members of the New Zealand Order of Merit
Netball players at the 1985 World Games
1983 World Netball Championships players
1987 World Netball Championships players
People educated at Lynfield College